The Harbor Creek School District is the public kindergarten-through-12th grade education system for Harborcreek, Pennsylvania. The school district is one of 501 school districts in the Commonwealth of Pennsylvania. By state law, the district has nine school board members in addition to its central administration. The district is composed of one high school, one junior high school and three elementary schools with approximately 2,000 students district wide. For the 2014-2015 school year, the district had a budget of nearly $29.7 million.

Administration

Board of Education 

School board members serve a term of four years. Elections are those positions are held in odd numbered years with the primary election in May and the general election in November. Elections for officers (president and vice president) are held annually, at the board's reorganization meeting, typically on the first Monday in December. The treasurer is elected by board members at the board meeting in July. The board members for 2016 were as follows, with office held:

 Curt Smith, President
 Bryan Fife, Vice President
 Justin Gallagher
 Terri Brink
 Theresa Herrara
 Renee Uht
 Mark Sallot
 Nancy Ferguson
 Christine Mitchell

Central administration 

 Kelly Hess, Superintendent
 Karl Dolak, Business Administrator
 Buckley Cook, Curriculum Director
 Mary Yount, Athletic Director
 Carl Moore, District Solicitor

Building administrators 

 Pam Chodubski, Principal, Harbor Creek Senior High School
 Andrew Krahe, Principal, Harbor Creek Junior High School
 Donna Rose, Principal, Clark Elementary School
 Tyler Cook, Principal, Klein Elementary School
 Cindy Zajac, Principal, Rolling Ridge Elementary School

Central Campus 

The Central Campus of the Harbor Creek School District is located at the intersection of U.S. Route 20 (Buffalo Road) and PA Route 531 (Depot Road). It contains the following facilities:

 Central Administration Office
 Senior High School
 Junior High School
 Paul J. Weitz Stadium
 Paul M. Foust Field [Baseball Field]
 Softball Field
 Transportation/Bussing Facilities
 Junior High Gymnasium (Varsity Volleyball, Varsity Boys and Girls Basketball and Varsity Wrestling teams play here)

The three elementary schools as well as the former Central High School are located on property in other areas of Harborcreek Township

Harbor Creek High School 

The high school serves grades 9 through 12. It is located at the intersection of U.S. Route 20 (Buffalo Road) and PA Route 531 (Depot Road).

Athletics 

The Harbor Creek Huskies are a member of PIAA District 10. The teams participate in either the 2A, 3A, or 4A classifications. The school district currently sponsors 17 varsity level sports (10 boys and 9 girls) teams:

(Classifications as of 2022/23 school year)

Fall sports 
 Cross Country (Boys and Girls) (2A)
 Football (Boys) (3A)
 Golf (Boys and Girls) (2A)
 Soccer (Boys and Girls) (2A)
 Volleyball (Girls) (2A)

Winter sports 
 Basketball (Boys and Girls) (4A)
 Swimming and Diving (Boys and Girls) (2A)
 Wrestling (Boys) (2A)
 Cheerleading (Girls) (2A)

Spring sports 
 Baseball (Boys) (3A)
 Softball (Girls) (3A)
 Tennis (Boys) (2A) 
 Track and Field (Boys and Girls) (2A)

PIAA State Champions 
 Wrestling, Rich Passerotti, Class AAA, 1978; Jeff Catrabone, Wrestling, Class AA, 1992 and 1993
 200 meter freestyle relay team, Boys Swimming, Class AA, 1998 - Lee Hall, Mark Ostrzeniec, Rick Podbielski, Chad Weaver
 Girls Softball, Class AA, 2006
 Lauren Zarger, Class AA, 2009 3200M Run
 Track and Field, Steve Moorhead 1958 A mile (4:26.1), Rich Arpin 1968 B mile (4:21.6) Rich Arpin 1968 B 880 (1:57.6) Brian Sontag 1990 AAA discus (163-4), Chris Carpin Class AA 2009               Pole Vault (14-6)

Harbor Creek Junior High School 
The junior high school currently serves grades 7 and 8. It is also located at the intersection of U.S. Route 20 (Buffalo Road) and PA Route 531 (Depot Road). While a separate building than the high school, it is connected to the high school via two corridors. The senior high school and junior high school share a cafeteria (located in the senior high school), but most student oriented activities for the schools occur in their own buildings.

Clark Elementary School 

Clark Elementary School currently serves students in grades K through 6. While the school services the largest geographic area compared to the other two elementary schools in Harborcreek, it is the smallest building in the district in terms of student population. The area of coverage for the school is most of the southern and eastern portion (from Troupe Road to North East Township) of the district, ranging from Lake Erie to the North, North East Township on the east and Greene Township to the south. The school is located on Depot Road, roughly 1.3 miles south of the High School/Junior High School, and about 1.1 miles north of Exit 35 on Interstate 90.

2014-15 renovation 

Clark Elementary School is closed during the 2014-15 school year for a multimillion-dollar renovation.  Clark Elementary School classes are held at the former Wesleyville Elementary School during this time.

Klein Elementary School 

Klein Elementary School currently serves students in grades K through 6. Students living in the Northwest portion of Harborcreek Township, generally north of Buffalo Road and west of Troupe Road, attend this school. The school is located on East Lake Road, just south of Lake Erie.

2006 flood 

On the morning of Monday, September 25, 2006 over 300,000 gallons of water was discovered in the basement of Klein Elementary School. The cause was attributed to debris in the public water system that found its way into the backflow prevention valve located just inside of the building. While the valve functioned properly, due to its location within the building, it was left in an open position for an estimated 55 hours which was more than enough time to fill the basement. For an unknown reason, the circuit breakers did not trip, and when the water submerged all of the electrical panels, the electricity flow heated the water to about 105 degrees. As a result, all of the equipment in that area was destroyed, submerged under 14 feet of water. The building was immediately closed, and remained closed for about one month, while the students were moved to Rolling Ridge Elementary (K-4th grades) and the Junior High School (5th and 6th grades). The cost to the school district was nearly $250,000 to replace the destroyed equipment. Through the cooperation of area contractors, the building was able to reopen on Monday, October 23, 2006.

2013-14 renovation 

The Klein Elementary School building was closed during the 2013-14 school year for a $6 million renovation project.  Upgrades include a new security system, a new heating and air conditioning system, new lighting, plumbing, flooring, furniture, windows and a new gymnasium.  Classes were held in the former Wesleyville Elementary School building in neighboring Wesleyville during the renovation. The school was reopened for the 2014-15 school year.

Rolling Ridge Elementary School 

Rolling Ridge Elementary School currently serves students in grades K through 6. Students living in the Southwestern portion of Harborcreek Township, generally south of Buffalo Road and west of Clark Road, attend this school. This school is the largest elementary school in the district in terms of student population. The school is located on Ridge Parkway, just south of the Eastside YMCA and Buffalo Road, and in between Nagle and Saltsman Roads. The school was remodeled in 2001.

External links 
 Harbor Creek School District web site 
 Pennsylvania Interscholastic Athletic Association website
 District 10 website
 Erie Times-News website
 Pennsylvania School Boards Association website

School districts established in 1900
School districts in Erie County, Pennsylvania
1900 establishments in Pennsylvania